The de Bohun then Bohun family is an English noble family of Norman origin that played a prominent role in English political and military history during the Late Middle Ages.  The swan used by the family and their descendants as a heraldic badge came to be called the Bohun swan.

Humphrey with the Beard (died c. 1113), who founded the English family, held the manor of Bohun (or Bohon) in Normandy – on the Cotentin Peninsula between Coutances and the estuary of the Vire. This is still reflected in place names such as Saint-André-de-Bohon and Saint-Georges-de-Bohon.  From one son of Humphrey with the same name, the male line continued, becoming Earls of Hereford, Essex and Northampton, using the name Humphrey repeatedly in successive generations.  The male line of another son of Humphrey with the Beard, Richard de Meri, died out in the 12th century, but his heirs in the female line took the surname of Bohun, giving rise to the Bohuns of Midhurst in West Sussex.

Humphrey with the Beard (died c. 1113)
Richard de Meri
Richard de Bohun
Richard de Bohun (d. 1179), Bishop of Coutances
Josceline de Bohon (c. 1111 – 1184), Bishop of Salisbury
Reginald Fitz Jocelin (d. 1191), Bishop of Bath, Archbishop of Canterbury-elect
Muriel, married Savaric Fitzcana of Midhurst
Geldewin
Franco de Bohun, ancestor of the Bohuns of Midhurst
Savaric FitzGeldewin (d. 1205), Bishop of Bath
Humphrey I de Bohun (died c. 1123), married Maud, daughter of Edward of Salisbury
Humphrey II de Bohun (died 1164/5), married Margaret, daughter of Miles of Gloucester
Humphrey III de Bohun (died 1181), married Margaret of Huntingdon
Henry de Bohun, 1st Earl of Hereford (1176–1220), a Norman-English nobleman
Humphrey de Bohun, 2nd Earl of Hereford and 1st Earl of Essex (Humphrey IV, c. 1204 – 1275), Constable of England
Humphrey V de Bohun (d. 1265), fought on the side of the rebellious barons in the Barons' War
Humphrey de Bohun, 3rd Earl of Hereford and 2nd Earl of Essex (Humphrey VI, c. 1249 – c. 1298), a key figure in the Norman conquest of Wales
Humphrey de Bohun, 4th Earl of Hereford, 3rd Earl of Essex (Humphrey VII, 1276–1321/2), one of the Ordainers who opposed Edward II's excesses
Eleanor de Bohun, Countess of Ormonde (1304–1363)
John de Bohun, 5th Earl of Hereford, 4th Earl of Essex (1306–1336)
Humphrey de Bohun, 6th Earl of Hereford, 5th Earl of Essex (Humphrey VIII, 1309–1361), Lord High Constable of England
Margaret de Bohun, Countess of Devon (1311–1391)
William de Bohun, 1st Earl of Northampton, KG (c. 1312 – 1360); English nobleman and military commander at the Battle of Crécy
Humphrey de Bohun, 7th Earl of Hereford, 6th Earl of Essex, 2nd Earl of Northampton (Humphrey IX, 1342–1373), an English noble during the reign of King Edward III
Eleanor de Bohun (c. 1366 – 1399); elder daughter and co-heiress
Mary de Bohun (c. 1368 – 1394); younger daughter, the first wife of King Henry IV of England and mother of King Henry V
Elizabeth de Bohun, Countess of Arundel and Surrey (c. 1350 – 1385)
Henry de Bohun (d. 1314), English knight killed by Robert I of Scotland at Bannockburn.

See also
 Bohun (disambiguation)

References

 
English families